Fisher Middle-High School is a secondary school in Jean Lafitte, an unincorporated area in Jefferson Parish, Louisiana. It is a part of Jefferson Parish Public Schools.

Athletics
Fisher High athletics competes in the LHSAA.

References

External links
 Fisher Middle-High School
 Fisher Middle-High School (Archive)

Public middle schools in Louisiana
Schools in Jefferson Parish, Louisiana
Public high schools in Louisiana